Aitkin may refer to:

Place names
In the United States:
Aitkin County, Minnesota
Aitkin, Minnesota, a city in the county
Aitkin Township, Aitkin County, Minnesota, a township in the county
Aitkin High School, Aitkin, Minnesota

People with the surname
 Alexander Aitkin, mathematician and first surveyor general of Upper Canada
 Don Aitkin, Australian political scientist

See also
 Aitken (disambiguation), includes "Aitkens"
 Adkins